The CZ 75 Tactical Sport pistol  is a Czech single-action firearm specifically designed for practical shooting competitions. It is the successor of the CZ 75 Standard IPSC model. Though almost identical in external appearance, the TS features some improvements, especially in its trigger mechanism, magazine capacity and durability. It was officially discontinued for production in 2018 by CZ.

Background
Originally, the CZ 75 IPSC models were manufactured in versions for two IPSC practical shooting divisions: Modified (the 75 M IPSC) and Standard (the 75 ST IPSC). Currently, there are no CZ models available for Modified Division. Recently CZ introduced the CZ 75 TS Czechmate  a competition variant based on the Tactical Sports 9mm model; equipped with a compensator and electronic red dot sight on a frame mount; designed especially for IPSC Open Division.

The CZ 75 TS comes in two calibers: .40 S&W (17 cartridges in the magazine) and 9mm (20 cartridges in the magazine). The .40 S&W caliber offers a score advantage by considering a higher or “major” caliber (according to the IPSC rules). However, the 9mm model is appealing to shooters who do not reload their ammo and in countries where the law does not allow the use of major calibers, as well as for those who want to take advantage of the low recoil and very high magazine capacity of the 9mm version.

CZ Custom has marketed a magazine extender for the .40 S&W version that increases capacity from 17 to 20 cartridges, but with this accessory the pistol is no longer legal in IPSC Standard Division, though it is eligible for USPSA Limited Division.

References 

Semi-automatic pistols of Czechoslovakia
9mm Parabellum semi-automatic pistols
.40 S&W semi-automatic pistols
Shooting sports equipment